St Joseph's Miltown Malbay GAA is a Gaelic Athletic Association club located in Miltown Malbay in County Clare, Ireland. The GAA club was formed in 1892.

Teams
The club has teams in both men's and women's competitions. It has men's teams at Senior, Junior A, U21, Minor, U16, U14, U12, U10 and U8 while it has women's teams in Senior, Junior, Minor, U16 and U14.

Notable players
Gordon Kelly
Noel Walsh

Ground
Miltown Malbay's home ground is Hennessy Memorial Park, located on Flag Road. It is named after Patrick Hennessy, a former Miltown Malbay and Clare footballer who was murdered on 14 April 1920 by British soldiers. Originally the park was named Miltown Malbay Athletic Grounds, until its renaming on 20 May 1951.

The club began leasing the grounds in 1924 from the mother of president Patrick Hillery for a period of 150 years at a rate of £15 per year. In the 1950s, it was sold to local butcher Tom Hynes, and in 1989, his son Michael Hynes sold the grounds to the club.

It underwent a major redevelopment in the 1990s and was rewarded with the hosting of county finals in both football and hurling in the late 90s as well as numerous inter-county matches.

In 2011, a 1,200 seater stand was opened on one side of the pitch.

Honours
 Munster Senior Club Football Championship Runners-Up: 2018
 Clare Senior Football Championship (15): 1905, 1906, 1916, 1923, 1925, 1927, 1932, 1949, 1953, 1959, 1985, 1990, 2015, 2018, 2019
 Clare Senior B Football Championship (1): 2007
 Clare Football League Div. 1 (Cusack Cup) (9): 1942, 1949, 1950, 1960, 1963, 1995, 2010, 2019, 2021
 Clare Football League Div.2 (Garry Cup) (1): 2005
 Munster Intermediate Club Football Championship Runners-Up: 2013
 Clare Intermediate Football Championship (1): 2013
 Clare Junior A Football Championship (3): 1923, 1924, 1949
 North Clare Senior Football Championship (1): 1997
 Clare Under-21 A Football Championship (5):  1970, 1971, 1977, 1978, 2002 (with Liscannor)
 Clare Under 21 B Football Championship (3): 1997, 2002, 2008
 Clare Minor A Football Championship (13): 1924, 1926, 1928, 1932, 1946, 1948, 1950, 1955, 1956, 1957, 1958, 1960, 1961
 Clare Under 16 Football League (2): 1984, 2006
 Clare Under 16 Football Championship (3): 1984, 2001, 2006
 Clare Under 15 Football Championship (12): 1933, 1943, 1945, 1946, 1947, 1950, 1951, 1953, 1955, 1956, 1957, 1958
 Clare Under 14 Féile Péil na nÓg (2): 1998, 2007
 Clare Under 12 A Football Championship (1): 2006
 Clare Under 12 B Football Championship (1): 2001
 Redmond Cup (1): 1906
 Clare Shield (2): 1981, 1991
 McNamara Cup (1): 1997

References

Gaelic games clubs in County Clare
Gaelic football clubs in County Clare
Milltown Malbay